Climax is a hamlet in the town of Coxsackie, Greene County, New York, United States. The zipcode is 12042.

Notes

Hamlets in Greene County, New York
Hamlets in New York (state)